Zanskar is a constituency in the erstwhile Jammu and Kashmir Legislative Assembly of erstwhile Jammu and Kashmir a north state of India. Zanskar is also part of Ladakh Lok Sabha constituency.

Member of Legislative Assembly

 1996: Mohammed Abbass, Jammu & Kashmir National Conference
 2002: Mohammed Abbass, Jammu & Kashmir National Conference
 2005: Ghulam Raza, Independent
 2008: Feroz Ahmed Khan, Jammu & Kashmir National Conference
 2014: Syed Mohammad Baqir Rizvi, Independent

Election results

2014

See also

 Zanskar
 Leh district
 List of constituencies of Jammu and Kashmir Legislative Assembly

References

Leh district
Government of Ladakh
Former assembly constituencies of Jammu and Kashmir